The 1963 Monaco Grand Prix was a Formula One motor race held at Monaco on 26 May 1963. It was race 1 of 10 in both the 1963 World Championship of Drivers and the 1963 International Cup for Formula One Manufacturers. The 100-lap race was won by British driver Graham Hill driving a BRM P57 after Jim Clark retired from the lead with a broken gearbox on lap 78.

Classification

Qualifying 

 - Before the last qualifying session, Chris Amon was instructed to hand his car over to Maurice Trintignant, who had a guaranteed starting berth, but had sufffered terminal issues with his own car

 - Despite the withdrawal of Chris Amon, Bernard Collomb did not qualify for the 16th and final spot on the grid, as his fastest lap time was not close enough to a 1:40 benchmark set by the organizers.

 Drivers that had a guaranteed start as former winners of the World Championship or the Monaco Grand Prix.

Race

Championship standings after the race

Drivers' Championship standings

Constructors' Championship standings

 Notes: Only the top five positions are included for both sets of standings.

References

Monaco Grand Prix
Monaco Grand Prix
European Grand Prix
Grand Prix
Monaco Grand Prix